The Public Safety Department - City of St. Louis is a municipal government department in the City of St. Louis. The Department of Public Safety is divided into three subordinate departments, six major divisions, two bureaus, a correctional institution and the city jail. The current Interim Director Director of Public Safety is Charles Coyle. Departments, divisions, and bureaus under the umbrella of the Department of Public Safety are responsible for a wide array of city services, including: building code enforcement; emergency management planning (and execution); fire prevention and suppression; emergency medical services; zoning; permits for residential and commercial construction, business occupancy, and the sale of distribution of alcoholic beverages; law enforcement; correctional facilities; neighborhood safety; and special event planning.

The Department of Public Safety is subject to the legislative oversight and direction of the Board of Aldermen's Public Safety Committee. The Public Safety Committee considers all matters pertaining to the Department of Public Safety, the Police Department, The Corrections Division, Excise and Liquor Control Division, Neighborhood Stabilization Team, the Fire Department, the Division of Building and Inspections and the City Emergency Management Agency.

Organization
The Director of the St. Louis Public Safety Department is appointed by the Mayor of St. Louis. The director is assisted in managing the Department by the Deputy Director of Public Safety and several division Commanders. 

 Director
 Deputy Director 
 Commissioner of Building & Code Division
 Commissioner of Emergency Management Agency
 Commissioner of Corrections Division
 Commissioner of Excise & Liquor Control Division
 Executive of Neighborhood Stabilization Team
 Commissioner of St. Louis Police Department
 Commissioner of St. Louis Fire Department – which includes the Bureau of Emergency Medical Services

Command staff

Mission statement

The published mission statement of the Department of Public Safety is:

External links
Website: Public Safety Department – City of St. Louis official website

References

State law enforcement agencies of Missouri
Government of St. Louis
Organizations based in St. Louis
1983 establishments in Missouri